Lineacoelotes is a genus of East Asian funnel weavers first described by X. Xu, S. Q. Li & X. P. Wang in 2008.

Species
 it contains nine species, all from China:

Lineacoelotes bicultratus (Chen, Zhao & Wang, 1991) – China
Lineacoelotes funiushanensis (Hu, Wang & Wang, 1991) – China
Lineacoelotes lifengyuanae Zhao & S. Q. Li, 2019 – China
Lineacoelotes longicephalus Xu, Li & Wang, 2008 – China
Lineacoelotes nitidus (Li & Zhang, 2002) – China
Lineacoelotes strenuus Xu, Li & Wang, 2008 – China
Lineacoelotes tiantaiensis Zhao & S. Q. Li, 2019 – China
Lineacoelotes zhongbaensis Zhao & S. Q. Li, 2019 – China
Lineacoelotes ziboensis Zhao & S. Q. Li, 2019 – China

References

External links

Agelenidae
Araneomorphae genera
Spiders of China